Virusampatti (Village ID 642370) is a village located at 9.11°N 78.25°E, in Tamil Nadu, India.  According to the 2011 census it has a population of 1288 living in 343 households. Its main agriculture product is chilli growing.

References

Villages in Thoothukudi district